Orobanche cernua, commonly known as nodding broomrape, is a species of herb in the family Orobanchaceae. They have a self-supporting growth form and simple, broad leaves. Individuals can grow to 0.4 m. Holoparasite of Artemisia spp. Distribution: Europe, SW Asia, Russia, Kazakhstan, Turkmenistan,

Uzbekistan Kyrgyzstan, Tajikistan, Afghanistan, Pakistan, N India, Nepal, China (Gansu, Hebei, Jilin, Nei Mongol, Qinghai, Shaanxi, Shanxi, Sichuan, Xinjiang, Xizang), Mongolia.

Sources

References 

cernua